This is a list of programs that have been broadcast on Adult Swim's (formerly Cartoon Network's) Toonami programming block. Broadcast times and ranges shown are with respect to the United States' Eastern Time Zone based on Adult Swim's headquarters being located in this time zone. The broadcast times and ranges can also be used in conjunction with the Pacific Time Zone based on the network's West Coast feed.

Animated series
Cartoon Network and Adult Swim have licensed a number of animated series for broadcast on the Toonami programming blocks over the years.

Anime

Domestic and other animation

Movies and specials

Microseries

Specials

Animated movies

Live-action movies

Giant Robot Week
From February 24–28, 2003, Toonami broadcast mecha shows that were licensed by ADV Films, some of which were picked up by Adult Swim. Besides Robotech, the following shows were featured:

Adult Swim April Fools' Day 2012
These shows have only aired during the Toonami April Fools' Day broadcast on Adult Swim, April 1, 2012.

Programs featured by block
A list of the lineups and programs featured in Toonami blocks. The schedule occasionally features "Toonami In Flight" blocks which contain movies or special presentations, as well as marathons and other scheduled programming that would occupy some of Cartoon Network and Adult Swim's regular programming.

Weekday Toonami on Cartoon Network

Weekday Toonami (1997–2004)

Moltar's block (1997–'99)
Programs included:
 Beast Wars: Transformers
 Cartoon Roulette
 Dragon Ball Z
 The Real Adventures of Jonny Quest
 ReBoot
 Robotech
 Sailor Moon
 Super Friends
 ThunderCats
 Voltron

TOM's blocks (1999–2004)
TOM took over Toonami's hosting duties starting . Toonami went from a 4–6 PM schedule to a 4–7 PM schedule starting . On September 1, 2000, DBZ: Garlic Jr. Saga Mini-Marathon, pre-empting of Sailor Moon and Gundam Wing for a day. On November 17, the film World's Finest aired from 5:00 to 6:30 PM. The regularly scheduled Dragon Ball Z, Tenchi Universe, Gundam Wing were pre-empted for the day and Superman: The Animated Series aired at 6:30 PM. It included the following programs:

 Batman: The Animated Series
 Dragon Ball Z
 Gundam Wing
 The Real Adventures of Jonny Quest
 ReBoot
 Ronin Warriors
 Sailor Moon
 Tenchi in Tokyo
 Tenchi Muyo!
 Tenchi Universe
 ThunderCats

On , the schedule was changed to 5–7 PM. On , the schedule went back to 4–7 PM. The programs under TOM 2.0's run include:

 Batman: The Animated Series
 Batman Beyond
 The Big O
 Blue Submarine No. 6
 Cardcaptors
 Dragon Ball
 Dragon Ball Z
 G-Gundam
 Gundam Wing
 Hamtaro
 He-Man and the Masters of the Universe
 Mobile Suit Gundam
 Mobile Suit Gundam: The 08th MS Team
 Outlaw Star
 The Powerpuff Girls
 ReBoot
 Ronin Warriors
 Sailor Moon
 Superman: The Animated Series
 Tenchi in Tokyo
 Tenchi Muyo
 Tenchi Universe
 Thundercats
 Transformers: Armada
 Yu Yu Hakusho
 Zoids: New Century Zero
 Zoids: Chaotic Century

This third iteration of TOM included the following programs:

 Astro Boy
 Cyborg 009
 Dragon Ball
 Dragon Ball GT
 Dragon Ball Z
 G Gundam
 He-Man and the Masters of the Universe
 Justice League
 Rurouni Kenshin
 Samurai Jack
 SD Gundam Force
 Transformers: Armada
 Yu Yu Hakusho

Midnight Run (2000–'03)
Midnight runs were moved to Weeknights at midnight, starting with Monday night/Tuesday morning to Friday night/Saturday morning.
 The Big O (until May 24, 2001)
 Dragon Ball (until October 30, 2002)
 Dragon Ball Z (until October 30, 2002)
 Dragon Ball Z: Dead Zone (October 31, 2001)
 G Gundam
 G.I. Joe: A Real American Hero (1985)
 Gundam 0080
 Gundam Wing (UNCUT)
 Mobile Suit Gundam: The 08th MS Team
 Outlaw Star
 Tenchi Muyo!
 Tenchi Universe
 Tenchi In Tokyo

Weekend Toonami on Cartoon Network

Saturday Toonami (1997–'99)
 Cartoon Roulette
 The Real Adventures of Jonny Quest
 Robotech
 ThunderCats
 Sailor Moon
 Voltron

Midnight Run (1999–2000)
Toonami's Midnight Run programming block started on Sunday at midnight and ran from 12–5 AM. It included the following programs:
 Cartoon Roulette
 Dragon Ball Z
 Dragon Ball Z: Dead Zone (October 30, 1999)
 G-Force: Guardians of Space
 The Powerpuff Girls
 The Real Adventures of Jonny Quest
 ReBoot
 Robotech
 Ronin Warriors
 Sailor Moon
 ThunderCats
 Voltron

Rising Sun (2000–'01)

Super Saturday (2001–'03)
Toonami's Saturday afternoon programming block ran from October 20, 2001, to February 22, 2003, from 1–3 PM, later changing to 1–4 PM in June 2002. It included the following programs:
 Dragon Ball
 Dragon Ball Z
 G-Gundam
 .hack//SIGN
 He-Man and the Masters of the Universe (2002)
 Samurai Jack
 Transformers: Armada
 Zoids: Chaotic Century

Toonami Saturday Night (2004–'08)
On , Toonami was moved to Saturday nights 7–11 PM with TOM's 3rd stint as the host. Miguzi would take over the former Toonami weekday space. On , the schedule was reduced to 9–11 PM. Programs broadcast include the following:

 Astro Boy (2003)
 The Batman
 Ben 10: Alien Force
 Blue Dragon
 Bobobo-bo Bo-bobo
 D.I.C.E.
 Dragon Ball GT
 Duel Masters
 Fantastic Four: World's Greatest Heroes
 Gundam SEED
 IGPX
 Jackie Chan Adventures
 Justice League Unlimited
 MÄR: Märchen Awakens Romance
 Megas XLR
 Naruto
 One Piece
 Pokémon: Battle Frontier
 Pokémon Chronicles
 The Prince of Tennis
 Rave Master
 Rurouni Kenshin
 Samurai Jack
 Star Wars: Clone Wars
 Storm Hawks
 Teen Titans
 Transformers Cybertron
 Wulin Warriors
 Yu-Gi-Oh!
 Yu-Gi-Oh! GX
 Yu Yu Hakusho
 Zatch Bell!

Toonami lineups on Adult Swim

2012–2019

2020–present

Toonami special blocks
Some of the special blocks that have aired in Toonami during its run on Cartoon Network:
 Toonami Lunar Eclipse (1999): Sailor Moon marathon
 Toonami DBZ20XL (1999): a week of Dragon Ball Z episodes during Weekday Toonami
 Toonami DBZ20XL Movie Marathon (1999): Dragon Ball Z: The Tree of Might, Dragon Ball Z: The World's Strongest, Dragon Ball Z: Dead Zone
 DBZ President's Day Movie Marathon (2000): Dragon Ball Z: The Tree of Might, Dragon Ball Z: The World's Strongest, Dragon Ball Z: Dead Zone
 New Year's Eve-il (2000, 2001): mostly Dragon Ball Z episodes
 Midnight Run Special Edition (2001): aired music videos from Gorillaz, the first four segments of Daft Punk's Interstella 5555, and Mark Osborne's short film More synchronized to "Hell Bent" by Kenna
 Zoids Cubed (2001):  Zoids: New Century Zero episodes
 Batman VS Superman (2002): alternating episodes from Batman: The Animated Series and Superman: The Animated Series
 April Fools Joker Virus (2002): episodes from Batman: The Animated Series featuring The Joker.
 Naruto Years Eve (New Year's Eve 2005): Naruto marathon
 A Month of Miyazaki (March 18-April 8, 2006): a month-long event featuring films directed by Hayao Miyazaki: Spirited Away, Princess Mononoke, Castle in the Sky and Nausicaä of the Valley of the Wind
 Giant Robot Week (February 24–28, 2003)
 April Fools (2012): a run of Toonami-related shows on Adult Swim
 April Fools (2018): a run of the majority of the already-scheduled anime lineup but subtitled with original Japanese audio.

See also
 List of programs broadcast by Cartoon Network
 List of programs broadcast by Cartoonito
 List of programs broadcast by Boomerang
 List of programs broadcast by Adult Swim

Notes

References

Lists of television series by network

Lists of programming blocks
Cartoon Network-related lists